Abijah II O'Neall House is a historic home located in Ripley Township, Montgomery County, Indiana. It was built in 1848, and is a two-story, five bay, Federal style brick I-house with a brick ell.  A wood-frame addition was built in 1910.

It was listed on the National Register of Historic Places in 2005.

References

Houses on the National Register of Historic Places in Indiana
Houses completed in 1848
Federal architecture in Indiana
Houses in Montgomery County, Indiana
National Register of Historic Places in Montgomery County, Indiana